U. lutea may refer to:

 Urechites lutea, a vining plant
 Uvaria lutea, a custard apple